Vrela is a village in the municipalities of Teslić (Republika Srpska) and Tešanj, Bosnia and Herzegovina.

Demographics 
According to the 2013 census, its population was 94, with 32 living in the Tešanj part and 62 living in the Teslić part.

References

Populated places in Tešanj
Populated places in Teslić